Christopher Wells is a British former professional tennis player.

Wells, based in London, was a British under-21 singles champion.

Active on tour in the 1970s, Wells made several attempts to qualify for the singles main draw at Wimbledon and featured in the mixed doubles main draw in 1979 (with Debbie Parker).

References

External links
 

Year of birth missing (living people)
Living people
British male tennis players
English male tennis players
Tennis people from Greater London